Loser is an Indian Telugu-language sports drama streaming television anthology series of  starring Priyadarshi, Kalpika Ganesh, Baby Annie, Sayaji Shinde, Shashank, Pavani Gangireddy and Chandra Vempaty.

Cast

Season 1 
 Priyadarshi as Suri Yadav
 Srikar Isetti as young Suri Yadav
 Shashank as Wilson
 Kalpika Ganesh as Ruby Shabana
Baby Annie as young Ruby Shabana
 Pavani Gangireddy as Pallavi, Suri's love interest 
 Komalee Prasad as Asha, Wilson's wife. 
 Dr.Malhotra Shivam as Saajid, Ruby's husband.
 Harshith Reddy as John, Wilson's son.
 Pavan Kumar as Sunny, Suri's younger brother. 
 Abhay Bethiganti as Tippu Sultan 'Tippu', Suri's Best friend. 
 Raahil as young Tippu Sultan 'Tippu'
 Chandra Vempaty as Chenchulayya, Ruby's Badminton Coach.
 Sayaji Shinde as Irfan, Ruby's father. 
 Satya Krishnan as Ruksana, Ruby's mother. 
 Vasu Inturi as Joseph, Wilson's elder brother. 
 Jaswica Nemo as Keerthana, young Ruby's best friend. 
 Viren Thanbidorai as Krishnan Siva Rama Chandran
 Ashok Kumar. K as Ranganath.
 Banerjee as Jairaj, Suri's Mentor and Pallavi's father (Cameo appearance)
 Roopa Lakshmi as Pallavi's mother. 
 Keshav Deepak as Sundar, Wilson's cricket coach.
 Dr.Giri as Arjun Sharma 
 Sattanna as Sattanna

Season 2 
 Dhanya Balakrishna as Maya Krishnan Siva Rama Chandran, Krishnan Siva Rama Chandran's daughter. 
 Sunayana as Adult Keerthana, Ruby's best friend 
Jaswica Nemo as Young Keerthana.
 Ravi Varma as Ravinder, Suri's Shooting Coach. 
 Venkat as Raghavender (Cameo role)
 Shishir Sharma as Farhan, Saajed's father
 Surya as Govardhan
 Krishna Teja as Bobby.
 Karthik Rebba as Elder Parithosh
 Armaan as Younger Parithosh
 Gayatri Bharghavi as Kaveri, Ruby's Inter college principal. 
 Sammetta Gandhi as Toy seller
 Charan Devudula as Karan, Arjun Sharma's son
 Tarak Ponnappa as Vinod, Pallavi's Business partner
 Lakshmi as Gouri.
 Giri as John's cricket coach and Wilson's former friend.

Episodes

Season 1

Reception 
The series received generally favourable reviews, with the actors' performances being praised.

References 

2020 Indian television series debuts
Telugu-language web series
2020 web series debuts
Indian drama web series
Indian sports television series
ZEE5 original programming
2020 web series endings
2020 Indian television series endings